Russia's Ekaterina Makarova and Elena Vesnina defeated Switzerland's Timea Bacsinszky and Martina Hingis in the final, 6–4, 6–4 to win the gold medal in Women's Doubles tennis at the 2016 Summer Olympics. In the bronze-medal match, the Czech Republic's Lucie Šafářová and Barbora Strýcová defeated compatriots Andrea Hlaváčková and Lucie Hradecká, 7–5, 6–1.

The tournament was held at the Olympic Tennis Centre in the Barra Olympic Park in Barra da Tijuca in the west zone of Rio de Janeiro, Brazil from 6–14 August 2016.

The United States' Serena Williams and Venus Williams were the two-time reigning gold medalists and top seeds, but they lost in the first round to Šafářová and Strýcová. The defeat ended the Williams sisters' 15 match winning streak in women's doubles at the Olympics, and marked their first loss together in Olympic competition.

Hingis attempted her chance to complete the career Golden Slam, she was originally to partner with Belinda Bencic but she partnered with Bacsinszky instead after Bencic withdrew due to ongoing wrist injury.

Schedule

Seeds 

  /  (first round)
  /  (first round)
  /  (quarterfinals)
  /  (quarterfinals)
  /  (final, silver medalists)
  /  (semifinals, fourth place)
  /  (champions, gold medalists)
  /  (quarterfinals)

Draw

Key

 INV = Tripartite invitation
 IP = ITF place
 Alt = Alternate
 PR = Protected ranking
 w/o = Walkover
 r = Retired
 d = Defaulted

Finals

Top half

Bottom half

References

External links
 Women's Doubles Drawsheet
 Olympic Tennis Event
 Entry List

2016
Women's Doubles
Tennis Doubles